Aston is a ward covering an area of north east Birmingham, including the district of Aston.

Demographics
The 2011 census found that 32,286 people were living in Aston. 50.4% of the population was female and 49.6% was male. This was above and below the national and city average respectively.

Aston is a very diverse community, ethnically, with 44% of the population born outside the United Kingdom. The largest ethnic group was Asian at 55%. More specifically, the Pakistani ethnic group was the largest at 38% of all Asians. Black British was the second largest ethnic group at 26%. White British was the third largest ethnic group at 18%. Islam was the most prominent religion in the ward with 54% of the ward's population stating themselves as Muslim, above the city average. Christianity was the second most prominent religion in Aston at 26%.

The ethnic makeup of the area drastically changed in the 1950s and 1960s with immigration from the Commonwealth. Most of the immigrants were from the Indian subcontinent, though a significant number were from the Caribbean.

Ward history
The ward was created in 1911, when Birmingham gained the Aston Manor Urban District. As a typical inner city ward, which tends to lose population the boundaries have been altered on a number of occasions.

Election fraud scandal
In 2004 the ward saw a voter fraud scandal in which Labour councillors were guilty of a systematic attempt to rig elections. They had set up a "vote-rigging factory" in a disused warehouse, stealing and intercepting hundreds and possibly thousands of ballot papers to achieve this. Three councillors, Mohammed Islam, Muhammed Afzal (later cleared) and Mohammed Kazi were convicted of voter fraud, with the elections having to be rerun. All three were barred from standing in the following election. The charges against Afzal were quashed by the Court of Appeal.

Politics
The Aston ward is currently represented by two Labour councillors: Muhammad Afzal and Nagina Kauser.

Election results

2020s

2010s

2000s

1990s

1980s

1970s

1960s

1950s

1940s

References

Wards of Birmingham, West Midlands